William Musgrave Calder I (March 3, 1869March 3, 1945) was an American politician and architect who served as a member of both chambers of the United States Congress from New York.

Early life and education
He was born in Brooklyn on March 3, 1869, to Susan Calder (née Ryan) and Alexander G. Calder, a carpenter and building contractor. He trained as a carpenter and attended night classes at Cooper Union.

Career 
Calder went into business as a builder and architect, most notably in the Park Slope and Flatbush neighborhoods of Brooklyn. In this capacity, he developed the "Calder House," a semi-detached two-family structure that was widely adopted in the latter district. From 1902 until his death, Calder resided in the former district at 551 1st Street, a limestone townhouse built by competitor William Flanagan.

He served as the Borough of Brooklyn building commissioner from 1902 to 1903. He represented New York as a Republican in the United States House of Representatives from 1905 until 1915. In 1914, he lost the Republican primary for the United States Senate to James Wolcott Wadsworth Jr. In 1916, he won the Republican primary, defeating Robert Bacon, and was elected to the Senate over Democratic National Committee chairman William F. McCombs in the general election. He served one term, from 1917 to 1923. During his tenure, he became well-known as the sponsor of the Standard Time Act in 1918 (also known as the Calder Act), the first U.S. law implementing standard time and daylight saving time in the United States. In 1922, he was defeated for re-election by Democrat Royal S. Copeland. After leaving Congress he continued to be active in the building trade and financial institutions.

Personal life 
In 1893, he married Catherine E. Harloe. His children were Elsie Calder, who married to Rear Admiral Robert C. Lee, and William M. Calder II. He died on March 3, 1945, which was his 76th birthday.

Legacy
His papers are held in a number of archives including: Herbert Hoover Presidential Library; the New York Historical Society; and Yale University. His grandson, William Musgrave Calder III, was professor emeritus of classics at the University of Illinois at Urbana–Champaign.

References

External links

1869 births
1945 deaths
People from Brooklyn
Burials at Green-Wood Cemetery
Republican Party United States senators from New York (state)
Republican Party members of the United States House of Representatives from New York (state)
Cooper Union alumni